Patricia Lynn Bostrom (born November 25, 1951) is an American former professional tennis player. She is better known as Trish Bostrom and after tennis became a lawyer in Washington.

Bostrom grew up in West Seattle and attended the University of Washington, winning the Pac-8 singles title in 1972. While at the university she was an advocate for gender equality in collegiate sports and successfully sued to be able to try out for a spot on the men's tennis team.

Graduating from the University of Washington in 1972, Bostrom competed on the professional tour for the remainder of the 1970s and played five seasons of World TeamTennis. Ranked as high as five in the world for doubles, she was a women's doubles semi-finalist at the Australian Open and a mixed doubles semi-finalist at the French Open.

WTA Tour finals

Doubles: 3 (0-3)

References

External links
 
 

1951 births
Living people
American female tennis players
Washington Huskies athletes
College women's tennis players in the United States
Tennis players from Seattle